Mayak is a rural locality (a settlement) in Andreyevskoye Rural Settlement, Alexandrovsky District, Vladimir Oblast, Russia. The population was 166 as of 2010. There are 16 streets.

Geography 
Mayak is located 6 km southeast of Alexandrov (the district's administrative centre) by road. Yelkino is the nearest rural locality.

References 

Rural localities in Alexandrovsky District, Vladimir Oblast